{{DISPLAYTITLE:C13H17N3}}
The molecular formula C13H17N3 (molar mass: 215.29 g/mol, exact mass: 215.1422 u) may refer to:

 BRL-44408
 Tramazoline

Molecular formulas